Hemipogon is a genus of flowering plants in the family Apocynaceae, first described as a genus in 1844. It is native to South America.

Species

formerly included
transferred to Astephanus

References

Apocynaceae genera
Flora of South America
Asclepiadoideae
Taxa named by Joseph Decaisne